Maxine Wahome (born 21 December 1995) is a former motorcross rider and current Kenyan racing driver.

Career
Maxine, daughter of retired Kenyan rally driver Jimmy Wahome and sister of Jeremy Wahome, started out as an autocross participant at an early age before scaling up to motocross. 

In June 2022, she made her maiden appearance in the Safari Rally held in Naivasha and went on to win the WRC3 class. She was navigated by co-driver  Waigwa Murage. Earlier in March 2022, she won the inaugural Lioness Rally in Kasarani while being navigated by Safina Khan.

Career results

Complete World Rally Championship results

Controversy
Maxine came to the limelight again for not very good reasons on December 13th, 2022, for an alleged physical assault on her 50-year boyfriend Asad Khan (rally driver). She was released on bail. On Tuesday, March 07, 2023, Director of Public Prosecution (DPP) Noordin Haji recommended the murder charge after reviewing Ms Wahome's case file and registering satisfaction with the evidence presented to support it. Following the DPP's recommendation, the Word Rally Championship (WRC) Safari Rally Kenya dropped Maxine Wahome from the Young Rally Stars Programme.

References

External links
 Maxine Wahome Profile at eWRC

Kenyan racing drivers
Kenyan rally drivers
1995 births
Living people
World Rally Championship drivers